The Battle of Helsingborg was fought on 8 July 1362 between the Danish and Hanseatic fleets.  

As part of the ongoing trading and territorial disputes between the Hanseatic League, Sweden, and Denmark, the Hanseatic cities made an agreement with Sweden and Holstein to jointly attack Denmark, the agreed targets being Helsingborg and Copenhagen. The Mayor of Lübeck, Johann Wittenborg, was put in command of an attack force of some 50 small seagoing ships, 5 of which had been paid for by Magnus Eriksson, King of Sweden.

As Wittenborg's fleet sailed through the narrow Øresund en route for Copenhagen he was persuaded to attack the town of Helsingborg and its fortified citadel. He disembarked his fighting men and besieged the stronghold for several weeks. In the meantime Valdemar Atterdag, King of Denmark, assembled his own fleet, which was capable of carrying an army of 2,500 men, and made a surprise attack on the Hanseatic Fleet.

The Danish were victorious as most of Wittenborg's soldiers were in the town. The Hanseatic cities lost twelve of their ships and several of their nobles were captured.

On his return to Lübeck, Wittenborg was tried and executed because of his poor performance in the war. The captured nobles were later ransomed and the war brought to an end on 22 November 1365 by the peace treaty of Vordingborg.

References
 Dollinger, Philippe (1999). The German Hansa. Routledge. . 
 Article includes material from the equivalent article on Norwegian wiki

Naval battles of the Danish-German War
1362 in Europe
1360s in Denmark
14th century in Denmark
Naval battles involving Denmark
History of Lübeck
Conflicts in 1362
Naval battles involving the Hanseatic League